Max Burgess (born 16 January 1995) is an Australian professional footballer who plays for Sydney FC in the A-League.

Career

Sydney FC
Burgess started his career at Rockdale City Suns under coach Branko Culina, where he was spotted by Sydney FC management and signed up to the Sydney FC Youth team. He made his first start for the senior squad in Round 1 of the 2014-15 A-League against Melbourne City.

Newcastle Jets
On 28 March 2015 Newcastle Jets announced that they had signed Burgess as an injury replacement player for the remainder of the 2014–15 A-League season. Burgess made his Jet's inauguration in the Round 23 clash against Adelaide United, coming off the bench as a substitute for fellow youngster Mitch Cooper. He continued his spree of appearances, and was issued a yellow card in the 4–3 loss to Sydney FC. His A-League season culminated against the Brisbane Roar in the final round of the season, again coming on for the aforementioned Cooper in the 52nd minute. The game ended 2–1 to the Roar.

Return to Sydney
On 3 August 2015, Burgess returned to Sydney FC as part of the FFA Cup squad and the Youth Team.

C.F. União
Burgess joined Portuguese LigaPro side União in June 2017 on a three-year deal.

Wellington Phoenix
In October 2018, Burgess joined Wellington Phoenix on a one-year contract from Sydney Olympic.

Western United
On 16 May 2019, it was announced that Burgess would be departing from the Phoenix. He later signed for Western United on a two-year contract. Burgess scored his first hat-trick in the A-League on 1 March 2020 against Central Coast Mariners.

Second Return to Sydney FC 
It was announced in late May 2021, that Burgess would sign a third time for Sydney FC in controversial manner, after walking way from Western United with a season left to run on his contract.

References

External links 
 

1995 births
Living people
Association football midfielders
Sydney FC players
Newcastle Jets FC players
C.F. União players
Rockdale Ilinden FC players
Sydney Olympic FC players
A-League Men players
National Premier Leagues players
Australian expatriate soccer players
Australian expatriate sportspeople in Portugal
Expatriate footballers in Portugal
Wellington Phoenix FC players
Western United FC players
Soccer players from Sydney
Australian soccer players